Portarlington RFC is an Irish rugby club based in Portarlington, County Laois, their men's senior team are playing in Division 2B of the Leinster League. Their ladies' team is an amalgamation with Cill Dara RFC and is called PortDara Falcons and are playing in Division 3 of the Ladies Leinster League.

The club colours are maroon and white.

Juvenile
Portarlington rugby juveniles are making steady progress. Much talent is coming right through from the minis section. Recent success was the U13 making a Leinster final. U17s won the Leinster League in 2013 by defeating Carlow in Portlaoise. Key players such as Robert Pigott, Keith Kavanagh & Jordan Fitzpatrick have been selected for the Leinster Development squads.

References
 www.leinsterrugby.ie

Irish rugby union teams
Rugby clubs established in 1974
Rugby union clubs in County Laois
Portarlington, County Laois